Giulio Bas (21 April 1874 – 27 August 1929) was an Italian 
Romantic composer and organist.

Life
Born in Venice, he studied with Giovanni Tebaldini at the Cappella Marciana and with Marco Enrico Bossi at the Liceo Musicale of Venice. He completed his studies with Josef Rheinberger in Munich. From 1901 he was second organist at St. Mark's in Venice and after 1903 organist in Calvi, Teano, and then at San Luigi dei Francesi in Rome. From 1912 till his death he was teacher at the Conservatorio.

He died in Vobbia, near Genoa.

Compositions

Organ solo
 16 Preludi-Corali su melodie degli otto toni dei Salmi
 Organ Sonata in F (pub. 1909)

Theoretical works
 Manuale di canto gregoriano (1910)
 Metodo di accompagnamento al canto gregoriano e di composizione negli 8 modi (1920)
 Trattato d'armonia (1922–3)
 Trattato di forme musicali (2 vols, 1920–2)

References

Sources

External links
 Biography at Carrara Editions 

1874 births
1929 deaths
19th-century Italian musicians
19th-century Italian male musicians
20th-century classical composers
20th-century Italian composers
20th-century Italian male musicians
Cappella Marciana composers
Cecilian composers
Composers for pipe organ
Italian Romantic composers
Italian classical composers
Italian male classical composers
Italian classical organists
Male classical organists